Annuello is a locality situated in the Mallee region of Australia.

It is located in a wheat growing area begun by soldier settlers after World War I. A post office opened on 15 April 1921, a month after the railway line towards Robinvale began operations. The station was closed to passengers in February 1978, and the line was closed in January 2008.

A strain of wheat suitable for the area is named Annuello.

A 'back to Annuello' weekend was held for ex residents in September 2022.Homage-to-hardship:-ghost-town-reunion-

References

Towns in Victoria (Australia)
Rural City of Swan Hill